Alas! Poor Yorick! is a 1913 American short comedy film featuring Fatty Arbuckle. The film's title is taken from the Shakespeare play Hamlet.  The film was both written and directed by Colin Campbell, and was released on April 21, 1913.

Plot
A mental patient, who in his mind is an amazing actor, escapes from a psychiatric hospital. Every theater manager in town is notified and the first man that causes suspicion is  Montgomery Irving, a poor actor in disgrace who honestly looks and acts crazy. He applies for the position, but he doesn't understand why he is arrested without any reason, when he was about to destroy the house the manager is informed that the real patient was captured somewhere else.

Cast
 Wheeler Oakman
 Tom Santschi (as Thomas Santschi)
 Lillian Hayward
 Hobart Bosworth
 John Lancaster 
 Frank Clark
 Roscoe 'Fatty' Arbuckle

See also
 Fatty Arbuckle filmography

References

External links

1913 films
Silent American comedy films
1913 comedy films
1913 short films
American black-and-white films
Hamlet
Films directed by Colin Campbell
American silent short films
American comedy short films
1910s American films